Stericta is a genus of snout moths. It was described by Julius Lederer in 1863.

Species
 Stericta aeruginosa T. P. Lucas, 1894
 Stericta angulosa de Joannis, 1929
 Stericta angusta (Inoue, 1988)
 Stericta angustalis Caradja, 1925
 Stericta asopialis (Snellen, 1890)
 Stericta atribasalis Warren, 1895
 Stericta basalis (South, 1901)
 Stericta basilaris de Joannis, 1930
 Stericta bryomima (Turner, 1913)
 Stericta callibrya Meyrick, 1933
 Stericta caradjai West, 1931
 Stericta carbonalis (Guenée, 1854)
 Stericta carneotincta Hampson, 1896
 Stericta centralis (Wileman-South, 1917)
 Stericta chlorophoena (Turner, 1937)
 Stericta concisella (Walker, 1866)
 Stericta congenitalis Hampson, 1906
 Stericta corticalis Pagenstecher, 1900
 Stericta divitalis (Guenée, 1854)
 Stericta dochmoscia (Turner, 1905)
 Stericta dohrni E. Hering, 1901
 Stericta evanescens Butler, 1887
 Stericta flammealis Kenrick, 1907
 Stericta flavopuncta Inoue & Sasaki, 1995
 Stericta gelechiella (Walker, 1866)
 Stericta hoenei Caradja & Meyrick, 1935
 Stericta inconcisa Walker, 1863
 Stericta ignebasalis Hampson, 1916
 Stericta indistincta Rothschild, 1915
 Stericta jucundalis Walker, [1866]
 Stericta kiiensis (Marumo, 1920)
 Stericta kogii Inoue & Sasaki, 1995
 Stericta lactealis Caradja, 1931
 Stericta leucozonalis Hampson, 1906
 Stericta lophocepsalis Hampson, 1906
 Stericta loxochlaena Meyrick, 1938
 Stericta mediovialis Hampson, 1916
 Stericta olivialis Hampson, 1903
 Stericta orchidivora (Turner, 1904)
 Stericta phanerostola Hampson, 1916
 Stericta philobrya (Turner, 1937)
 Stericta plumbifloccalis Hampson, 1896
 Stericta prasina Warren, 1895
 Stericta rufescens Hampson, 1896
 Stericta rurealis Kenrick, 1912
 Stericta sectilis Hering, 1901
 Stericta sinuosa (Moore, 1888)
 Stericta subviridalis Kenrick, 1907

References

External links
 

Epipaschiinae
Pyralidae genera